Acanthus is a genus of about 30 species of flowering plants in the family Acanthaceae, native to tropical and warm temperate regions, with the highest species diversity in the Mediterranean Basin and Asia. This flowering plant is nectar producing and is susceptible to predation by butterflies, such as Anartia fatima, and other nectar feeding organisms. Common names include Acanthus and Bear's breeches. The generic name derives from the Greek term  (akanthos) for Acanthus mollis, a plant that was commonly imitated in Corinthian capitals.

The genus comprises herbaceous perennial plants, rarely subshrubs, with spiny leaves and flower spikes bearing white or purplish flowers.

Selected species
Acanthus arboreus Forssk. (1775)
Acanthus austromontanus Vollesen
Acanthus balcanicus Heywood & I.Richardson (Syn. Acanthus hungaricus (Borbás) Baenitz, Acanthus longifolius Host) — native to the Balkans south of Dalmatia
Acanthus dioscoridis Willd.
Acanthus ebracteatus Vahl —  This species occurs in South Asia, including Brunei Darussalam, China, South Taiwan, India, Malaysia, Philippines, Singapore, Thailand, Viet Nam, Cambodia, and Indonesia. In Australasia it is found in northeast Australia, northwest Australia, Papua New Guinea, and the Solomon Islands.
Acanthus eminens C.B.Clarke — native to tropical Africa
Acanthus greuterianus Snogerup, B.Snogerup & Strid (2006) — This species was discovered in NW Greece.
Acanthus hirsutus Boiss. — native to Turkey, Syria
Acanthus ilicifolius L. — native to India and Sri Lanka
Acanthus kulalensis Vollesen
Acanthus latisepalus C.B. Clarke (1899)
Acanthus leucostachyus Wall. ex Nees. (1832)
Acanthus longibracteatus Kurz (1870)
Acanthus mayaccanus Büttner (1890)
Acanthus mollis L. — native to Mediterranean Europe
Acanthus montanus T.Anders. — West and Central African species, from Ghana in the west to Angola and the Democratic Republic of Congo. 
Acanthus pubescens Thomson ex Oliv.
Acanthus polystachyus Delile — native to Burundi, Rwanda, DRC, Uganda, Sudan, Ethiopia, Kenya, Tanzania.
Acanthus spinosus L. — native to southern Europe
Acanthus syriacus Boiss. (Syn. Acanthus hirsutus subsp. syriacus) — native to the Eastern Mediterranean region
Acanthus uleensis De Wild. — native to Central (primarily DR Congo and Republic of the Congo) and East Africa (primarily Tanzania)

Cultivation and uses 
[[Image:AcanthusmollisPalatineHill.jpg|thumb|left|An acanthus plant (A. mollis) flowering in the ruins of the Palatine Hill, Rome, May 2005]]
Acanthus leaves were the aesthetic basis for capitals in the Corinthian order of architecture; see acanthus (ornament). Several species, especially A. balcanicus, A. spinosus and A. mollis, are grown as ornamental plants.

Acanthus leaves also have many medicinal uses. Acanthus ilicifolius, whose chemical composition has been heavily researched, is widely used in ethnopharmaceutical applications, including in Indian and Chinese traditional medicine. Various parts of Acanthus ilicifolius have been used to treat asthma, diabetes, leprosy, hepatitis, snake bites, and rheumatoid arthritis. The leaves of Acanthus ebracteatus'', noted for their antioxidant properties, are used for making Thai herbal tea in Thailand and Indonesia.

References

External links
Flora Europaea: Acanthus
Images of Acanthus

 
Acanthaceae genera
Taxa named by Carl Linnaeus